The Joseph R. Biden, Jr., Railroad Station, also known as Wilmington station, is a passenger rail station in Wilmington, Delaware. It serves nine Amtrak train routes and is part of the Northeast Corridor. It also serves SEPTA Regional Rail commuter trains on the Wilmington/Newark Line as well as DART First State local buses and Greyhound Lines intercity buses.

Built in 1907 as Pennsylvania Station, the station was renamed in 2011 for then-Vice President (now President) Joe Biden, an advocate for passenger rail who routinely took the train from Wilmington to Washington, D.C. during his time as a Senator from 1973 to 2009. In 1987, Biden formally announced his ultimately unsuccessful bid for the 1988 Democratic presidential nomination at this station. Located on Front Street between French and Walnut Streets in downtown Wilmington, the station has one inside level with stores, a cafe/newsstand, Amtrak and SEPTA ticket offices, a car rental office, and restrooms. Passengers board their trains on the second-story train platforms.

History

The station replaced an earlier station erected by the Philadelphia, Wilmington and Baltimore Railroad.

It was built in 1907 for $300,000 by the PW&B successor, the Pennsylvania Railroad. It was designed by renowned architect Frank Furness, who also designed the adjacent Pennsylvania Railroad Building (which housed the offices for the Delaware Division of the Pennsylvania Railroad) and the nearby Baltimore & Ohio Railroad's Water Street Station. (The Pennsylvania Railroad Building has since been renovated; as of 2014, it holds the offices of ING Direct United States.)

Admired for his use of new and innovative materials and his forceful architectural statements, Furness chose to have the trains move right through the second floor of the station, with room for a ticketing and retail concourse at ground level underneath the tracks. This unconventional arrangement celebrated the power of the locomotive and America's industrial strength. The north end of the station has a four-faced rectangular clock tower that rises an extra story above the main roof. It is decorated with stone and terra cotta work that is repeated in plainer form throughout the station.

Wilmington Station has been listed on the National Register of Historic Places since 1976.  A renovation project was conducted in 1984.  The National Register added the adjacent railroad viaduct in 1999. SEPTA has been running to Wilmington since 1989.

In 2009, the station began a two-year restoration; about two-thirds of the $37.7 million in funding came from United States government stimulus funds. During construction, customer operations, including platform access, were moved to a temporary station next door. The station reopened on December 6, 2010, and final work was completed in March 2011.

On March 19, 2011, the station's name was changed from Wilmington Station to Joseph R. Biden, Jr., Railroad Station. The ceremony honored U.S. Vice President (now President) Joe Biden, who took over 7,000 round trips from the station to Washington, D.C. during his U.S. Senate career and was noted as an advocate for Amtrak and passenger rail more generally. On January 20, 2017, within an hour after completing his tenure as vice president, Biden boarded an Amtrak Acela train in Washington, D.C. bound for his namesake station.

The adjacent Wilmington Transit Center for DART First State bus service opened in May 2020.

Services

Trains

The station is served by Amtrak Northeast Regional and Acela trains along the Northeast Corridor going south to Baltimore and Washington, D.C., and going north to Philadelphia, New York City, and Boston. It is also served by several long distance trains including the Cardinal to Chicago, the Carolinian to Charlotte, the Crescent to New Orleans, the Palmetto to Savannah, the Silver Star and the Silver Meteor to Miami, and the Vermonter to St. Albans, Vermont. Amtrak Thruway Motorcoach service is provided through the station to Dover, Delaware and Salisbury, Maryland via Greyhound Lines.

Despite being just 25 miles south of Philadelphia's 30th Street Station, the third-busiest Amtrak station in the country, Wilmington Station is a major Amtrak station in its own right. It is the seventh-busiest Amtrak station in the Mid-Atlantic region (behind New York Penn, Washington Union, 30th Street, Baltimore Penn, Albany-Rensselaer and BWI) and the 13th-busiest nationwide.

It is also served by SEPTA Regional Rail's Wilmington/Newark Line with service to Center City Philadelphia and Newark, Delaware. Like all stations in Delaware, SEPTA service is provided under contract and funded through DART First State, which also provides extensive local bus service as they have since 1994.

Intercity buses

Greyhound Lines intercity buses stop at the Wilmington Bus Station adjacent to the Wilmington station at 101 North French Street. The bus terminal is attached to the station's parking garage. Greyhound Lines provides direct, one-seat ride service from the bus terminal to various cities including Baltimore, New York City, Norfolk, Philadelphia, Richmond, and Washington, D.C.

Local transit

DART First State bus routes serving Wilmington station include 2, 5, 6, 10, 11, 13, 14, 18, 20, 28, 31, 33, 35, 37, 40, 47, 52, 301, and 305 (seasonally). Most buses stop at the Wilmington Transit Center adjacent to the station.

The Wilmington Transit Center was built as a DART First State bus hub adjacent to Wilmington station. A groundbreaking ceremony for the transit center was held on November 19, 2018, with Governor John Carney, U.S. Senator Tom Carper, Wilmington Mayor Mike Purzycki, DelDOT Secretary Jennifer Cohan, and DART First State CEO John Sisson in attendance. The Wilmington Transit Center serves most DART First State bus routes in Wilmington and includes a covered waiting area with seats, real-time bus displays, a ticket sales office, restrooms, vending machines, bicycle racks, and parking. Construction of the transit center cost $19 million and opened on May 17, 2020.

Station layout

See also

 Wilmington and Western Railroad
 List of Delaware railroads
 Wilmington Rail Viaduct
 National Register of Historic Places listings in Wilmington, Delaware

References

Further reading

External links

Wilmington – SEPTA
Wilmington Amtrak & SEPTA Station – USA RailGuide (TrainWeb)
Friends of Furness Railroad District 
, 
NRHP Station Listing with Photos 
Station on Google Maps Street View: Front Street entrance, French Street entrance, West end of station
Article from Railroad Age Gazette (1908) with original floor plan

Railway stations on the National Register of Historic Places in Delaware
Historic American Engineering Record in Delaware
Amtrak stations in Delaware
Buildings and structures in Wilmington, Delaware
SEPTA Regional Rail stations
DART First State
Stations on the Northeast Corridor
Amtrak Thruway Motorcoach stations in Delaware
Clock towers in Delaware
Wilmington Riverfront
Frank Furness buildings
Transportation buildings and structures in New Castle County, Delaware
Railway stations in the United States opened in 1908
National Register of Historic Places in Wilmington, Delaware
1908 establishments in Delaware
Former Pennsylvania Railroad stations
Joe Biden
Wilmington/Newark Line